Fullstack Academy is an immersive software engineering coding bootcamp located in New York City.  Students of the full-time flagship course learn full stack JavaScript over the course of a 13-week, on-campus program.  Fullstack Academy offers beginner courses in Javascript (JavaScript Jumpstart) and front-end development, as well as a summer program for college-age students (Summer of Code), and a part-time version of their full-time curriculum (Flex).

History
Fullstack Academy was founded in 2012 by David Yang (formerly of Yahoo!, Gilt) and Wharton School alumnus Nimit Maru (formerly of Yahoo!, Bloomspot).  After succeeding as a Y-Combinator-backed startup, Fullstack graduated its first cohort of students in 2013, and moved to its current location in Hanover Square in November 2014. In 2019, Fullstack Academy was acquired by Bridgepoint Education. Founders David Yang and Nimit Maru left the company in 2021. As of 2021, Fullstack no longer offers an in person bootcamp in Chicago.

Course offerings
Fullstack's flagship immersive course begins with a four-week "foundations" course, to be completed remotely before arriving on-campus.  The on-site component of the program involves thirteen weeks of intensive JavaScript education, incorporating a lecture-workshop format, as well as a team-based project phase.  Back-end languages taught include Node.js/Express; front end languages include React.js/JavaScript MVC, HTML5, and CSS3; and Data Structures taught include MONGODB, NoSQL, and Postgres.  Full-time students have access to career assistance following graduation. Tuition for the full-time immersive is $17,610.

The Flex-Immersive is a part-time course covering the same content as Fullstack Academy's full-time program.  The foundations course and career assistance programs are also available to Flex students.

Summer of Code is an immersive course for college and graduate school students with computer science or technically equivalent experience, held each year between June and August. The course is full-time and adheres to the same curriculum and structure as the flagship immersive program.

Admissions
Fullstack Academy's immersive courses (Full-Time, Flex-Immersive, & Summer of Code) use selective admissions procedures, admitting approximately 8% of applicants.

Applicants for the Full-time Immersive, Flex, and Summer of Code programs must pass a fundamental-skills evaluation, technical interview, and in-person interview prior to program acceptance.

Awards and media
Fullstack Academy was named Best Coding Bootcamp of 2015 by SkilledUp.com. Fullstack, its co-founders, and former students have received media coverage from Forbes.com, The Huffington Post, Business Insider, VentureBeat.com, and Fox5NY.

See also
 Web Development

References

External links
 

Y Combinator companies
Schools in Manhattan
Educational institutions established in 2013
2013 establishments in the United States